The 1984 European Parliament election in Ireland was the Irish component of the 1984 European Parliament election. The election was conducted under the single transferable vote. A constitutional amendment to allow the franchise at general elections to be extended to non-Irish citizens was approved by referendum on the same day.

Results

MEPs elected

Voting details

See also
List of members of the European Parliament for Ireland, 1984–89 – List ordered by constituency

External links
ElectionsIreland.org – 1984 European Parliament (Ireland) election results

1984 in Irish politics
Ireland
European 1984
European 1984